Cedric Noah Figaro (born August 17, 1966) is a former linebacker who played seven seasons in the NFL. He played college football at Notre Dame.

1966 births
Living people
American football linebackers
Notre Dame Fighting Irish football players
San Diego Chargers players
Indianapolis Colts players
Cleveland Browns players
Amsterdam Admirals players
St. Louis Rams players